Siphosethu Tom (born 12 February 1992) is a South African rugby union player, currently playing with the . He can play as a wing or at centre.

Personal life

Tom was born in Port Elizabeth to Kwenzekile Eric Tom and Nomamerika Yvonne Tom. His mother is from Gugulethu, Cape Town while his father is from Fort Beaufort, where the family has settled. Both of Tom's parents work at Tower Rehabilitation Hospital in Fort Beaufort.

Rugby career

Tom began his rugby career at primary school level. He attended Fort Beaufort Primary School, and was selected to represent Eastern Province at the 2005 Under-13 Craven Week tournament.

He moved to Bloemfontein to continue his secondary education at Grey College, where he also continued to play rugby. He represented the Free State province at the Under-16 Grant Khomo Week tournaments in both 2007 and 2008, and at South Africa's premier high school rugby union event, the Under-18 Craven Week, in both 2009 and 2010, scoring two tries in the unofficial final against Western Province in the latter.

He also scored three tries in seven appearances for the  team in the 2013 Under-21 Provincial Championship.

Tom returned to the province of his birth, the Eastern Cape, to join East London-based  for their final three matches in the 2015 Currie Cup First Division.

Player statistics

References

South African rugby union players
Living people
1992 births
Rugby union players from Port Elizabeth
Rugby union centres
Rugby union wings
Border Bulldogs players
Free State Cheetahs players